DPI-221 is an opioid drug that is used in scientific research. It is a highly selective agonist for the δ-opioid receptor, which produces fewer convulsions than most drugs from this family.

References 

Synthetic opioids
Delta-opioid receptor agonists
Benzamides
Piperazines
Fluoroarenes